Glucosylglycerate synthase (Ggs (gene)) is an enzyme with systematic name ADP-glucose:D-glycerate 2-alpha-D-glucosyltransferase. This enzyme catalyses the following chemical reaction

 ADP-glucose + D-glycerate  2-O-(alpha-D-glucopyranosyl)-D-glycerate + ADP

Persephonella marina possesses two enzymatic systems for the synthesis of glucosylglycerate.

References

External links 

EC 2.4.1